The Rainmakers may refer to:

Music
The Rainmakers (band), from Kansas City, Missouri, US
 The Rainmakers (album), 1986
The Rainmakers, an Australian band whose members included Neil Murray and Christine Anu
The Rainmakers, a Filipino Manila sound group

Other uses
The Rainmakers (film), a 1935 American comedy
 Seattle Yannigans/Rainmakers, a baseball team

See also
 Rainmaker (disambiguation)